Krešimir Režić (born 13 October 1981) is a Croatian football coach and most recently the manager of Saudi Arabian club Damac.

Career
Krešimir Režić was born in Split on 13 October 1981. As a player, Režić played for NK Došk, NK Solin, and NK Jadran Supetar. He worked at Hajduk Split's youth academy from 2007 until 2017, and from 2013 until 2014 he was the assistant manager of Mladen Ivančić in the Croatia U17 national team.

In the summer of 2017, Režić joined Saudi Arabian club Al-Nassr to manage their U15 team. In the summer of 2019, Režić took the reins of the newly promoted 2.HNL side Croatia Zmijavci. In June 2020, after finishing the season in second place, he left the club by mutual consent. On 14 September 2020, Režić joined Saudi Arabian club Damac to manage their U19 team. On 12 January 2021, Režić was named as first-team manager following the sacking of Noureddine Zekri. In his first season at the club, Režić managed to lead the club to safety and finish in eleventh. During the 2021–22 season, Režić was awarded the manager of the month award for September after leading the club to second place. On 21 December 2021, Režić renewed his contract with Damac until the end of the 2022–23 season. On 6 March 2023, Režić was sacked by Damac after a 2–1 loss to Al-Taawoun.

Managerial statistics

Honours
Individual
Saudi Professional League Manager of the Month: September 2021

References

External links
 

1981 births
Living people
Footballers from Split, Croatia
Association footballers not categorized by position
Croatian footballers
NK Solin players
Croatian football managers
Damac FC managers
Saudi Professional League managers
Croatian expatriate football managers
Expatriate football managers in Saudi Arabia
Croatian expatriate sportspeople in Saudi Arabia
HNK Hajduk Split non-playing staff